The Glad Eye is a 1927 British silent comedy film directed by Maurice Elvey and starring Estelle Brody, Mabel Poulton and Jeanne de Casalis. It was a remake of The Glad Eye, a 1920 film based on the play Le Zebre by Paul Armont. It was made at Twickenham Studios.

Cast
 Estelle Brody - Kiki
 Mabel Poulton - Suzanne
 Jeanne de Casalis - Lucienne
 Hal Sherman - Chausette
 Aubrey Fitzgerald - The Footman
 A. Bromley Davenport - Galipau
 John Longden - Floquet
 John Stuart - Maurice
 Humberston Wright - Gaston

References

Bibliography
 Low, Rachael. History of the British Film, 1918-1929. George Allen & Unwin, 1971.
 Wood, Linda. British Films 1927-1939. British Film Institute, 1986.

External links

1927 films
1927 comedy films
British silent feature films
1920s English-language films
Films directed by Maurice Elvey
British films based on plays
Films shot at Twickenham Film Studios
British comedy films
Remakes of British films
British black-and-white films
Films produced by Victor Saville
Films with screenplays by Victor Saville
1920s British films
Silent comedy films